Bopa  is a town, arrondissement, and commune in the Mono Department of south-western Benin.The commune covers an area of 365 square kilometres and as of 2002 had a population of 70,268 people.

References
 

Communes of Benin
Arrondissements of Benin
Populated places in the Mono Department